Sessea sodiroi is a species of plant in the family Solanaceae. It is endemic to Ecuador.

References

Cestroideae
Flora of Ecuador
Vulnerable plants
Taxonomy articles created by Polbot
Taxa named by Friedrich August Georg Bitter